Viola Florence Barnes (August 28, 1885 – July 1, 1979) was an American historian and writer, one of the most prominent female historians in the US in the first half of 20th century.

Life
Born in Albion, Nebraska, Barnes was educated at the University of Nebraska and Yale University. She taught at Smith College (1933) and Mount Holyoke College (1933–1952). In 1940, she was honored by the Women's Centennial Congress as one of a hundred successful women in fields formerly closed to women.

She focused on the history of New England and the Maritime provinces, her most famous work was The Dominion of New England (1923).

Her papers are held at Mount Holyoke.

References

Sources
 John G. Reid, Viola Florence Barnes, 1885-1979: a historian's biography, University of Toronto Press, 2005
 "Viola Florence Barnes." Contemporary Authors Online. Detroit: Gale, 2001. Gale Biography In Context. Web. 13 Feb. 2011.

1885 births
1979 deaths
University of Nebraska alumni
Yale University alumni
Smith College faculty
Mount Holyoke College faculty
20th-century American historians
Historians of the United States
Historians of Canada
People from Albion, Nebraska
American women historians
20th-century American women writers